Meridarchis picroscopa is a moth in the family Carposinidae. It is found in New Guinea.

References

Natural History Museum Lepidoptera generic names catalog

Carposinidae